Gillespie is both a masculine given name and a surname in the English language. Variants include Gillaspie and Gillispie.

Origins 
The given name is an Anglicised form of the Gaelic Gille Easbaig (also rendered Gilleasbaig), meaning "bishop's servant". The surname Gillespie is an Anglicised form of the Scottish Gaelic Mac Gille Easbuig, and the Irish Mac Giolla Easpaig, both of which mean "bishop's servant's son". The given name itself is derived from a word of Latin origin, the Old Irish epscop being derived from the Latin episcopus.

An early example of the name in Scotland occurs in a charter dated 1175–1199, recording a certain "Ewano filio Gillaspeck". In Ireland, a family bearing the surname occupied the office of toísech of Clann Aílebra in the late twelfth century. In 1172, for example, the toísech was slain by Donn Slébe Ua hEochada, King of Ulster. This slain Mac Gilla Espuic may be identical to a certain Gilla Óengusa mac Gilla Espuic, rechtaire of the Monaig of Ulster, who is earlier recorded in the king's service. Whatever the case, a later family bearing the surname appears on record as erenaghs of Kilraine in County Donegal. During the 16th and 17th centuries in Ireland, the surname was most common in Ulster. During the nineteenth century in Ireland, the surname was most numerous in the counties of Antrim, Donegal, Armagh, and Tyrone. Scottish Gaelic forms of the surname include GillEasbuig and GillEasbaig.

Gillespie
 A. Arnold Gillespie (1899–1978), American cinema special effects artist
 Aaron Gillespie (born 1983), American rock singer & drummer
 Alastair Gillespie (1922-2018), Canadian politician
 Albert Gillespie (1912–1938), Australian cricketer and Royal Air Force officer
 Archibald H. Gillespie (1810–1873), officer in the United States Marine Corps
 Bill Gillespie (journalist) (born 1946), Canadian journalist and author
 Bill Gillespie (politician) (1928–2008), American politician
 Bill Gillespie (footballer) (1887–1927), Australian footballer
 Billy Gillespie (1891–1981), Irish football (soccer) player
 Bobby Gillespie (born 1962), Scottish rock and roll musician
 Brock Gillespie (born 1982), American expatriate basketball player
 Charles Gillespie (1883–1964), New Zealand rugby union player and soldier
 Charles A. Gillespie Jr. (1935–2008), American diplomat
 Charlie Gillespie (born 1998), Canadian actor and singer
 Collin Gillespie (born 1999), American basketball player
 Craig Gillespie (born 1967), Australian film director
 Dan Gillespie Sells (born 1979), English singer
 Dana Gillespie (born 1949), British actress and singer
 Daniel Gillespie (born 1938), American physicist
 Darlene Gillespie (born 1941), Mousketeer born in Canada
 David Gillespie (disambiguation), several people
 Dean M. Gillespie (1884–1949), American politician
 Dizzy Gillespie (1917–1993), American jazz musician
 Earl Gillespie (1922–2003), American sportscaster
 Ed Gillespie (born 1961), American politician
 Floris Gillespie (1882–1967), Scottish painter
 Gary Gillespie (born 1960), Scottish footballer
 George Gillespie (1613–1648), Scottish theologian
 George Lewis Gillespie Jr. (1841–1913), US Army officer
 Gina Gillespie (born 1951), American former child actress, now an attorney
 Gregor Gillespie (born 1987), 4x NCAA Division 1 All-American Wrestler
 Haven Gillespie (1888–1975), American composer and lyricist
 Jacqueline Pascarl-Gillespie (born 1963), Australian author
 James Gillespie (disambiguation), several people
 Janetta Gillespie (1876–1956), Scottish artist
 Jason Gillespie (born 1975), Australian cricketer
 John Gillespie (disambiguation), several people
 Joseph Gillespie (1809–1885), American politician
 Keith Gillespie (born 1975), Northern Irish footballer
 Kevin Gillespie (disambiguation), several people
 Margaret V. Gillespie (born 1969), American politician
 Mark Gillespie (disambiguation), several people
 Mike Gillespie (disambiguation), several people
 Mitch Gillespie (born 1959), American politician
 Norm Gillespie, association football coach in Australia in the 1940s
 Nick Gillespie (born 1963), American editor and political writer
 Paul Gillespie (1920–1970), Major League Baseball catcher
 Phillip Gillespie (born 1975), Australian cricket umpire
 Robert Gillespie (born 1933), British actor, director and writer
 Ronald Gillespie (1924–2021), Canadian chemist
 Ross Gillespie (1935–2023), New Zealand hockey player
 Steven Gillespie (born 1985), English footballer
 Stuart Gillespie (born 1957), New Zealand cricketer
 Thomas Gillespie (disambiguation), several people
 Tyree Gillespie (born 1998), American football player
 William Gillespie (disambiguation), several people

Fictional characters 
 Alessa Gillespie and Dahlia Gillespie, in the Silent Hill video game series
 Chief Bill Gillespie, in the novel In the Heat of the Night and its film and television adaptations
 Dr. Leonard Gillespie, in the Dr. Kildare and Dr. Gillespie film series
 Rudy Gillespie, on the television series Kickin' It

Gillaspie
 Conor Gillaspie (born 1987), American baseball player
 Kayne Gillaspie (born 1979), American fashion designer
 Logan Gillaspie (born 1997), American baseball player

Gillispie
 Billy Gillispie (born 1959), American basketball coach
 Charles Coulston Gillispie (1918–2015), American historian of science

See also
 Tara Gilesbie, author of My Immortal
 Gillespie (disambiguation)

References

English-language surnames
Anglicised Scottish Gaelic-language surnames